Montgomery Gentry is an American country music duo founded by Eddie Montgomery and Troy Gentry. Its discography comprises 11 studio albums, five compilation albums, two extended plays, and 38 singles. The duo made its debut in 1999 with the single "Hillbilly Shoes," which went to number 13 on the Hot Country Songs charts, but did not reach number one until mid-2004, with "If You Ever Stop Loving Me." The duo has sent four more singles to Number One for a total of five: "Something to Be Proud Of" (2005), "Lucky Man" (2007), "Back When I Knew It All", and "Roll with Me" (both 2008). Besides these, Montgomery Gentry has reached the Top 10 with 10 additional hit singles. All 15 of these songs have charted on the Billboard Hot 100, where the duo's highest peak is "If You Ever Stop Loving Me" at number 30.

Montgomery Gentry's first, third, and fourth albums — 1999's Tattoos & Scars, 2002's My Town and 2004's You Do Your Thing — are all certified platinum by the Recording Industry Association of America (RIAA) for shipments of one million copies. 2001's Carrying On, 2005's Something to Be Proud Of: The Best of 1999–2005, and 2006's Some People Change are all certified gold.

Studio albums

1990s

2000s

2010s

Compilation albums

Extended plays

Singles

1990s and 2000s

2010s and 2020s

As a featured artist

Other charted songs

Videography

Video albums

Music videos

Guest appearances

Notes

References

 
 
Country music discographies
Discographies of American artists